Koh-Lanta: Nicoya was the second season of the French version of Survivor, Koh-Lanta. This season took place in Costa Rica on the island of Nicoya, and was broadcast on TF1 from June 28, 2002 to September 13, 2002 airing on Saturdays and Sundays at 6:55 p.m. The two original tribes this season were Tambor and Ventanas. As part of a special twist this season following the evacuation of Xavier in episode two, Jacky who was voted out of the Tambor tribe in the previous episode returned to the game. This season also saw the first tribal swap in the history of Koh-Lanta, in which Bernard and Jacky was sent to the Ventanas tribe.

The winner of this season of Koh-Lanta was Amel Fatnassi, who took home the prize of €100,000 after winning in a 5-2 jury vote against Nicolas Roy.

Contestants

Future appearances
Amel Fatnassi returned for Koh-Lanta: Le Retour des Héros. Maud Garnier and Nicolas Roy returned for Koh-Lanta: La Revanche des Héros.

Challenges

Voting History

References

External links
https://web.archive.org/web/20120316160652/http://www.tf1.fr/koh-lanta/saisons/koh-lanta-2-nicoya-4351206.html

02
2002 French television seasons
Television shows filmed in Costa Rica